Verden Allen (born Terence Allen, 26 May 1944, Crynant, Neath, Wales) is a british organ player and vocalist best known as a founding member of 1970s rock band Mott the Hoople. Before that band formed, he had in the mid-1960s been in a rhythm and blues cover band called The Inmates and recorded with Jimmy Cliff.

He left Mott after their breakthrough 1972 album All The Young Dudes. He is featured singing on a few Mott songs, including the demo version of "Nightmare", released on the (reissue) of the album Mott, as well as "Soft Ground" on the original release. After he left Mott, he joined up with future Pretenders members James Honeyman-Scott and Martin Chambers in a band called The Cheeks. They disbanded in 1976 after failing to get a record deal. On his 1999 solo album, For Each Other, Allen played all the instruments and the album was released by Angel Air Records, who reissued all the classic Mott the Hoople albums during the early 2000s.

In January 2009 it was confirmed that Allen and the other original members of Mott the Hoople would reform for two 40th anniversary reunion concerts in October 2009. This was later expanded to cover five dates, all at the Hammersmith Apollo. A further five-date tour followed, in November 2013, covering dates across the UK.

References

External links
Verden Allen Biography
Verden Allen entries at WorldCat.org

1944 births
Living people
People from Neath Port Talbot
Welsh keyboardists
Welsh rock musicians
Welsh songwriters
Mott the Hoople members
Glam rock musicians
Welsh organists
British male organists
21st-century organists
21st-century British male musicians
British male songwriters